The City University of Seattle, also known as Vysoká škola manažmentu (VŠM), is located in the Slovak capital, Bratislava, and the cities of Trenčín and Poprad. In 1991, City University of Seattle began its degree programs in former Czechoslovakia. VŠM was founded on December 1, 1999 as the first private college in Slovakia. In 2007, City University added 'of Seattle' to its official title as part of a rebranding effort.

As of January 2008, VŠM offers the following degrees:
Slovak Bachelor of Business Administration
Slovak bachelor's in Knowledge Management
Slovak Magister of Knowledge Management
City University of Seattle Bachelor of Science in Business Administration (BSBA)
City University of Seattle Master of Business Administration (MBA)

VŠM in Bratislava serves as the official European headquarters of City University of Seattle.

References 
 Bratislava location and history
 Trenčín location and history

External links 
 

Business schools in Slovakia